98 Mute is the debut release by the hardcore punk band, 98 Mute. It was released on May 3, 1996, on Theologian Records. It was co-produced by Pennywise's guitarist Fletcher Dragge and features Justin Thirsk on drums, the brother of the late Jason Thirsk, Pennywise bass player. It was the first of four albums before the band split up. They followed this album with Class of 98 in 1998.

Track listing

Credits

98 Mute
 Pat Ivie – vocals
 Jason Page – guitar
 Doug Weems – bass
 Justin Thirsk – drums

Recording
 Recorded and mixed at Total Access, Redondo Beach, California, USA
 Produced and mixed by Fletcher Dragge and Eddie Ashworth
 Engineered by Eddie Ashworth

References

External links
98 Mute official website
Epitaph Records band page
Theologian Records website

1996 debut albums
98 Mute albums